Rory Barnes (born 1946) is an Australian writer of popular fiction. Although born in London, he has lived most of his life in Australia.

Bibliography
Valencies (1983 with Damien Broderick)
The Bomb-Monger's Daughter (1984)
Water From The Moon (1989 with James Birrell)
Zones (1997 with Damien Broderick)
The Book of Revelation (1998 with Damien Broderick) Reprinted in the US as Dark Gray (2010)
Horsehead Boy (1998)
Horsehead Man (1999)
Stuck in Fast Forward (1999 with Damien Broderick, revised and extended as The Hunger of Time)
Horsehead Soup (2000)
Night Vision (2006)
I'm Dying Here (2009 with Damien Broderick, also known as I Suppose a Root's Out of the Question)
The Dragon Raft (2010)
Human's Burden (2010 with Damien Broderick)
Space Junk (2011)
The Valley of the God of Our Choice, Inc. (2014 with Damien Broderick)
Source: rorybarnes.net

Nominations
Aurealis Awards
Best science fiction novel
1997: Nomination: Zones (with Damien Broderick)
1999: Nomination: The Book of Revelation (with Damien Broderick)
Best young-adult novel
1997: Nomination: Zones (with Damien Broderick)
1998: Nomination: Horsehead Boy
1999: Nomination: Horsehead Man
1999: Nomination: Stuck in Fast Forward (with Damien Broderick)
2000: Nomination: Horsehead Soup

Ditmar Awards
Best Australian long science fiction or fantasy
1984: Nomination: Valencies (with Damien Broderick)
Best novel
2000: Nomination: The Book of Revelation (with Damien Broderick)

Children's Book Council of Australia
1998: Listed as Notable Australian Children's Book: Zones
1999: Listed as Notable Australian Children's Book: Horsehead Boy

References

External links
 Official site

1946 births
Living people
Australian children's writers
Australian science fiction writers